The Dirlewanger Brigade, also known as the SS-Sturmbrigade Dirlewanger (1944), or the 36th Waffen Grenadier Division of the SS, or The Black Hunters, was a unit of the Waffen-SS during World War II. The unit, named after its commander Oskar Dirlewanger, consisted of convicted criminals who were not expected to survive their service with the unit. Originally formed in 1940 and first deployed for counter-insurgency duties against the Polish resistance movement, the brigade saw service in anti-partisan actions in German-occupied Eastern Europe.

During its operations, the unit participated in the mass murder of civilians and in other war crimes in German-occupied Eastern Europe. It gained a reputation among Wehrmacht and Waffen-SS officers for its brutality. Several members such as Hans von Cullen were put to death post-war by ad-hoc tribunals. Several commanders attempted to remove Dirlewanger from command and to dissolve the unit, but powerful patrons within the Nazi apparatus protected Dirlewanger and intervened on his behalf. Amongst other actions, the unit took part in the destruction of Warsaw in late 1944 and in the massacre of around 100,000 of Warsaw's inhabitants in August 1944 during the Warsaw Uprising – as well as in the brutal suppression of the Slovak National Uprising of August to October 1944.

Oskar Dirlewanger

The eponymous Dirlewanger Brigade was led by World War I veteran and convicted criminal Oskar Dirlewanger, considered an amoral violent alcoholic who was claimed to have possessed a sadistic sexual orientation and a barbaric nature; he has been described as "the most evil man" in the SS. 

After enlisting in the German Army as a machine gunner in 1913, Dirlewanger served in the XIII (Royal Württemberg) Corps rising to the rank of Leutnant (lieutenant) and receiving the Iron Cross first and second class during WWI. He joined the Freikorps and took part in crushing the German Revolution of 1918–19. After graduating from Frankfurt's Citizens' University with a doctorate in political science in 1922, he worked at a bank and a knitwear factory. By 1923 he had joined the Nazi Party. In 1934 he was sentenced to two years' imprisonment for "contributing to the delinquency of a minor with whom he was sexually involved", and for stealing government property. The conviction led to him being expelled from the Nazi Party (but he was permitted to reapply for membership). Soon after his release, Dirlewanger was rearrested for sexual assault and sent to a concentration camp at Welzheim. In desperation, he contacted his old WWI comrade Gottlob Berger who was now a senior Nazi working closely with Reichsführer-SS Heinrich Himmler. Berger used his influence to help Dirlewanger join the Condor Legion, a German unit which fought in the Spanish Civil War (1936–1939).

On his return to Germany in 1939, Berger helped Dirlewanger join the Allgemeine SS (General SS) with the rank of SS-Untersturmführer. In mid-1940, after the invasion of Poland, Berger arranged for Dirlewanger to command and train a military unit of convicted poachers for partisan-hunting (Bandenbekämpfung).

Composition
On 23 March 1940, a department in the Ministry of Justice received a telephone call from Himmler's headquarters informing them that Adolf Hitler had decided to give "suspended sentences to so-called 'honorable poachers' and, depending on their behaviour at the front, to pardon them". A confirmation of Hitler's order was sent specifying that the poachers should, where possible, be Bavarian and Austrian, not be guilty of crimes involving trap setting, and were to be enrolled in marksmen's rifle corps. The men were to combine their knowledge of hunting and woodcraft similar to traditional Jäger elite riflemen with the courage and initiative of those who willingly broke the law. In late May 1940 Dirlewanger was sent to Oranienburg to take charge of 80 selected men convicted of poaching crimes who were temporarily released from their sentences. After two months training, 55 men were selected with the rest sent back to prison. On 14 June 1940, the Wilddiebkommando Oranienburg ("Oranienburg Poacher's Unit") was formed as part of the Waffen-SS. Himmler made Dirlewanger its commander. The unit was sent to Poland where it was joined by four Waffen-SS NCOs selected for their previous disciplinary records and twenty other recruits. By September 1940, the formation numbered over 300 men. Dirlewanger was promoted to SS-Obersturmführer by Himmler. With the influx of criminals, the emphasis on poachers was now lost, though many of the former poachers rose to NCO ranks to train the unit. Those convicted of other more severe crimes, including the criminally insane, also joined the unit.

From the beginning, the formation attracted criticism from both the Nazi Party and the SS for the idea that convicted criminals who were forbidden to carry arms, therefore then exempt from conscription in the Wehrmacht, could be a part of the elite SS. A solution was found where it was proclaimed that the formation was not part of the SS, but under control of the SS. Accordingly, the unit name was changed to Sonderkommando Dirlewanger ("Special Unit Dirlewanger"). As the unit strength grew, it was placed under the command of the SS-Totenkopfverbände (the formation responsible for the administration of the concentration camps) and redesignated as the SS-Sonderbataillon Dirlewanger. In January 1942, to rebuild its strength, the unit was authorised to recruit Russian and Ukrainian volunteers. By February 1943, the number of men in the battalion doubled to 700 (half of them Volksdeutsche). It became a Waffen-SS unit again in late 1944. In May 1944, the 550 men (Turkestanis, Volga Tartars, Azerbaijanis, Kirghiz, Uzbek, and Tadjiks) from the Ostmuslemanische SS-Regiment were attached to the Dirlewanger Brigade.

Although other Strafbataillons were raised as the war proceeded and the need for further manpower grew, these penal military units were for those convicted of military offences, whereas the recruits sent to the unit were convicted of major crimes such as premeditated murder, rape, arson, and burglary. Dirlewanger provided them with an opportunity to commit atrocities on such a scale that it even raised complaints within the brutal SS. Historian Martin Windrow described them as a "terrifying rabble" of "cut-throats, renegades, sadistic morons, and cashiered rejects from other units". Some Nazi officials romanticized the unit, viewing the men as "pure primitive German men" who were "resisting the law".

Operational history
During the organization's time in the Soviet Union, Dirlewanger's unit burned women and children alive, let packs of starved dogs feed on them, and injected Jews with strychnine. Transcripts of the Nuremberg trials show Soviet prosecutors frequently questioning defendants accused of war crimes on the Eastern Front about their knowledge of the Dirlewanger Brigade.

Poland
On 1 August 1940, the unit was assigned to guard duties in the region of Lublin (site of a Nazi-established "Jew reservation" established under the Nisko Plan) in the General Government territory of German-occupied Poland. According to journalist and author, Matthew Cooper, "wherever the Dirlewanger unit operated, corruption and rape formed an every-day part of life and indiscriminate slaughter, beatings and looting were rife". Even within the brutal regime of the General Government concerns were raised about the unit's conduct. Höherer SS- und Polizeiführer (HSSPF) Friedrich-Wilhelm Krüger, who himself was a war criminal and mass murderer, was so disturbed by the unlawful behaviour of the Dirlewanger Brigade that his complaints resulted in its transfer to Byelorussia in February 1942.

The unit's crimes continued when it returned to Poland to help suppress the Warsaw Uprising in 1944. Crimes included the mass rape and murder of 15 Red Cross nurses and the killing of thousands of civilians. After troops entered a makeshift military hospital, they first killed the wounded with bayonets and rifle butts before gang raping the women. The naked bleeding nurses were then taken outside and hanged by their feet and shot in their stomachs. The unit would carry out cruel atrocities during the Wola massacre in which more than 40,000 Polish civilians were killed in reprisals on the direct orders of Himmler.

Byelorussia
Byelorussia (modern-day Belarus) formed part of Reichskommissariat Ostland and had formerly been part of the Soviet Union. In this region, the unit came under the command of local HSSPF Erich von dem Bach-Zelewski. The unit resumed its so-called anti-partisan activities (Bandenbekämpfung in the official German designation), working in cooperation with the Kaminski Brigade, a militia force composed of Soviet nationals under the command of Bronislav Kaminski. Dirlewanger's preferred method of operation was to gather civilians in a barn, set it on fire, and shoot at anyone who tried to escape; the victims of his unit numbered about 30,000.

According to historian Timothy Snyder:

In September 1942, the unit murdered 8,350 Jews in Baranovichi ghetto and then a further 389 people labeled "bandits" and 1,274 "bandit suspects". According to historian Martin Kitchen, the unit "committed such shocking atrocities in the Soviet Union, in the pursuit of partisans, that even an SS court was called upon to investigate."

On 17 August 1942, the expansion of the battalion to regimental size was authorized. Recruits were to come from criminals, Eastern volunteers (Osttruppen), and military delinquents. A second battalion was established in February 1943 when the regiment's strength reached 700 men, of whom 300 were anti-communists from Soviet territory; and the unit was redesignated as the SS-Sonderregiment Dirlewanger (SS Special Regiment Dirlewanger). In May 1943, the eligibility to volunteer for service in the regiment was extended to all criminals and as a result 500 men convicted of the most severe crimes were absorbed into the regiment. May and June saw the unit taking part in Operation Cottbus, an anti-partisan operation. In August 1943, the creation of a third battalion was authorised. With its expansion, the regiment was allowed to display rank insignia and a unique collar patch in form of crossed rifles with a stick grenade under them. During this period, the regiment saw heavy fighting; Dirlewanger himself led many assaults.

In November 1943, the regiment was committed to front-line action with Army Group Centre in an attempt to halt the Soviet advance, and suffered extreme casualties due to ineptitude. Dirlewanger received the German Cross in gold on 5 December 1943 in recognition of his earnestness, but by 30 December 1943, the unit consisted of only 259 men. Large numbers of amnestied criminals were sent to rebuild the regiment and by late February 1944, the regiment was back up to full strength. It was decided that Eastern volunteers would no longer be admitted to the unit, as the Russians had proven to be particularly unreliable in combat. Anti-partisan operations continued until June 1944, when the Soviets launched Operation Bagration, which was aimed at the destruction of Army Group Centre. The unit was caught up in the retreat and began falling back to Poland. The regiment sustained heavy casualties during several rearguard actions but reached Poland.

Return to Poland

When the Armia Krajowa began the Warsaw Uprising on 1 August 1944, Dirlewanger was sent into action as part of the Kampfgruppe formation led by SS-Gruppenführer Heinz Reinefarth; once again serving alongside Bronislav Kaminski's militia (now named SS Sturmbrigade RONA). Acting on orders that came directly from Himmler, Kaminski's and Dirlewanger's men were given a free hand to rape, loot, torture and butcher.

In what became known as the Wola massacre, RONA and Dirlewanger personnel indiscriminately massacred Polish combatants along with civilian men, women and children, in the Wola District of Warsaw. Up to 40,000 civilians were murdered in Wola in less than two weeks of August, including all hospital patients and staff. Many otherwise unknown crimes committed by the unit at Wola were later revealed by Mathias Schenck, a Belgian national who was serving in the area as a German Army sapper. Regarding an incident in which 500 small children were murdered, Schenck stated: 

The regiment arrived in Warsaw with only 865 enlisted personnel and 16 officers but it soon received 2,500 replacements. These included 1,900 German convicts from the SS military camp at Danzig-Matzkau. Nevertheless extremely high casualties were inflicted on the unit during fighting in Warsaw by the Polish resistance. During the course of the two-month urban warfare Dirlewanger's regiment lost 2,733 men. Thus, total casualties numbered 315% of the unit's initial strength. While some of the regiment's actions were criticized by Erich von dem Bach-Zelewski (who after the war described them as "a herd of pigs") and the sector commander, Generalmajor Günter Rohr, Dirlewanger was recommended for the Knight's Cross of the Iron Cross by Reinefarth and a promotion to SS-Oberführer der Reserve.

By 3 October 1944, the remaining Polish insurgents had surrendered and the depleted regiment spent the next month guarding the line along the Vistula. During this time, the regiment was upgraded to brigade status and named SS-Sonderbrigade Dirlewanger (SS Special Brigade Dirlewanger). In early October, it was decided to upgrade the unit again, this time to a Waffen-SS combat brigade. Accordingly, it was redesignated as 2. SS-Sturmbrigade Dirlewanger (2nd SS Assault Brigade Dirlewanger) in December 1944, and had soon reached its complement of 4,000 men.

Slovakia and Hungary
When the Slovak National Uprising began in late August 1944, the newly formed brigade was committed to action. The brigade played a large part in putting down the rebellion by 30 October. With the outcome of the war no longer in doubt, large numbers of communist and socialist political prisoners began applying to join the unit in the hopes of defecting to the Soviets. SS-Brigadeführer Fritz Schmedes, former commander of the 4th SS Polizei Panzergrenadier Division, was assigned to the Dirlewanger Brigade by Himmler as punishment for refusing to carry out orders. With his extensive combat experience, Schmedes became the unofficial advisor to Dirlewanger on front line combat.

In December, the brigade was sent to the front in Hungary. While fighting there, several newly formed battalions made up of communist and socialist volunteers fell apart. During a month's fighting, the brigade suffered heavy casualties and was pulled back to Slovakia to refit and reorganize.

Germany
In February 1945, orders were given to expand the brigade to a division; however, before this could begin it was sent north to the Oder-Neisse line in an attempt to halt the Soviet advance. On 14 February 1945, the brigade was redesignated as the 36th Waffen Grenadier Division of the SS. With its expansion to a division of 4,000 men, regular army units were attached to the formation: a Grenadier regiment, a Pionier brigade, and a Panzerjäger battalion. Individual Sturmpionier demolition engineers had already been attached to the force during the fighting in Warsaw.

The division was pushed back to the northeast when the final Soviet offensive began on 16 April 1945. The next day, Dirlewanger was seriously wounded in combat for the twelfth time. He was removed from the front and he was sent to the rear and Schmedes immediately assumed command; Dirlewanger would not return to the division. Desertion became more and more common, and when Schmedes attempted to reorganize the division on 25 April, he found that it had virtually ceased to exist. On 28 April 1945, SS-Sturmbannführer Ewald Ehlers, who commanded the 73rd Waffen Grenadier Regiment of the SS within the division, was hanged by his own men. He had been a former commandant of Dachau concentration camp who had been convicted of corruption. On 1 May 1945, the Soviets wiped out all that was left of the unit in the Halbe pocket. Only a small remnant of the division managed an escape attempt to reach the US Army lines on the Elbe river. Schmedes and his staff managed to reach the Americans and surrendered on 3 May.

Only about 700 men of the division survived the war. In June 1945, Dirlewanger was captured by French forces in Germany and died in their custody by 8 June, allegedly beaten to death by Polish soldiers in Altshausen.

Orders of battle
SS Assault Brigade "Dirlewanger" (October 1944)
 Brigade staff
 SS Regiment 1
 SS Regiment 2
 Artillery detachment
 Fusilier company
 Engineer company
 Signals company

36th Waffen Grenadier Division of the SS (March 1945)
 Division staff
 72nd Waffen Grenadier Regiment of the SS
 73rd Waffen Grenadier Regiment of the SS
 Panzer Battalion Stansdorf 1
 36th Artillery Detachment
 36th Fusilier Company
 1244th Volksgrenadier Regiment
 687th Engineer Brigade (Heer)
 681st Heavy Panzerjäger Battalion (Heer)

Legacy
The cross-grenades emblem of the division is still used by Neo-Nazis, such as the Wolfsbrigade 44.

See also 
List of SS personnel
List of Waffen-SS divisions
List of Waffen-SS units

References

Notes

Bibliography
  Michaelis, Rolf – Das SS-Sonderkommando Dirlewanger: Ein Beispiel deutscher Besatzungspolitik in Weißrussland
 A witness account of a German Sturmpionier soldier from the Warsaw Uprising.com.
 Testimonies concerning activity of Division during Wola massacre

Infantry divisions of the Waffen-SS
Military units and formations established in 1940
Military units and formations disestablished in 1945
Nazi war crimes
Nazi war crimes in Poland
Penal units
36
Warsaw Uprising German forces